Igor Borisovich Korolev (September 6, 1970 – September 7, 2011) was a Russian-Canadian professional ice hockey player and coach. Korolev played over 700 games in the National Hockey League (NHL) from 1992 until 2004. Korolev returned to Russia, and played a further seven seasons in the Russian Super League (RSL) and the Kontinental Hockey League (KHL) before retiring from active play in 2010. In 2011, Korolev accepted an assistant coach position with Lokomotiv Yaroslavl of the KHL. Korolev was killed in the 2011 Lokomotiv Yaroslavl plane crash along with nearly the entire roster of Lokomotiv Yaroslavl. A native of the Russian Republic of the Soviet Union, Korolev became a naturalized Canadian citizen in 2000.

Playing career
Korolev began his professional playing career with HC Dynamo Moscow in the 1988–89 season appearing once. The following season, Korolev became a full member of the team, playing 17 games. He played two further full seasons with Dynamo. In all three seasons, Dynamo won the league championship. Korolev was drafted by the St. Louis Blues in the second round, 38th overall in the 1992 NHL Entry Draft. After five games with Dynamo in the 1992–93 season, Korolev left to join the Blues. Korolev played for the Blues for two seasons. Korolev was unsigned in the 1994–95 season and he returned to Dynamo. He was picked up by the Winnipeg Jets on waivers in 1995 and stayed with the team as it moved to Phoenix. He signed as a free agent with Toronto in 1997. He was traded to Chicago in 2001 where he played until 2004. He then returned to Russia and signed with Lokomotiv Yaroslavl. After one season, he transferred to Metallurg Magnitogorsk, where he played three seasons. He played one season with Atlant Moscow Oblast and one final season with Lokomotiv Yaroslavl where he retired after the 2009–10 season. He became an assistant coach with the team and was still an assistant at the time of his death.

Death

Korolev died on September 7, 2011, the day after he turned 41, when a Yakovlev Yak-42 passenger aircraft crashed just outside Yaroslavl, Russia while transporting Lokomotiv to Minsk to play their opening game of the season. Lokomotiv officials said "everyone from the main roster was on the plane plus four players from the youth team." All aboard were killed, aside from one crew member.

Personal
Igor and Vera Korolev married in June 1990. Igor and Vera have two daughters, Kristina and Anastasia. Korolev's family has a permanent home in the North York district of Toronto, Ontario, Canada. The Korolevs obtained Canadian citizenship in 2000. Korolev was buried in Toronto at Mount Pleasant Cemetery after a funeral on September 18, 2011. Korolev was the godfather of fellow NHL player Nik Antropov's son. Korolev and Antropov both played the 2000–01 season with the Toronto Maple Leafs.

Honors
Soviet championship:  1990 (with Dynamo)
Soviet championship:  1991 (with Dynamo)
Championship of SNG:  1992 (with Dynamo)
International Hockey League:  1993 (with Dynamo)
International Hockey League:  1995 (with Dynamo)
Russian Super League:  2007 (with Metallurg Magnitogorsk)

Career statistics

Regular season and playoffs

International

References

External links

1970 births
2011 deaths
Chicago Blackhawks players
Atlant Moscow Oblast players
HC Dynamo Moscow players
Metallurg Magnitogorsk players
Kalamazoo Wings (1974–2000) players
Lokomotiv Yaroslavl players
Naturalized citizens of Canada
Norfolk Admirals players
Phoenix Coyotes players
Phoenix Roadrunners (IHL) players
Russian emigrants to Canada
Russian ice hockey centres
St. Louis Blues draft picks
St. Louis Blues players
Soviet ice hockey centres
Ice hockey people from Moscow
Toronto Maple Leafs players
Winnipeg Jets (1979–1996) players
Victims of the Lokomotiv Yaroslavl plane crash
Burials at Mount Pleasant Cemetery, Toronto
Russian expatriate ice hockey people
Russian expatriate sportspeople in Canada
Russian expatriate sportspeople in the United States
Expatriate ice hockey players in the United States
Expatriate ice hockey players in Canada
Canadian ice hockey coaches
Russian ice hockey coaches
People from Zelenograd